The Aurora National Science High School (Mataas na Paaralang Nasyonal na Pang-agham ng Aurora in Filipino) is a secondary public science High School located in  Baler, Aurora, Philippines.  It is a DepEd-recognized science high school. ANSHS or ANSci is one of the most respected schools in Aurora.

Schools in Aurora (province)
Science high schools in the Philippines